Ireland and United States first played each other at rugby union in 1994 with Ireland emerging victorious, 26–15 at their home ground, Lansdowne Road, in Dublin. They have played each other eleven times, five times in the United States, five times in Ireland and once at a neutral venue in New Zealand during the 2011 Rugby World Cup. Ireland and the US also played each other in the 1999 Rugby World Cup, but the fixture was played at Ireland's home ground. Ireland's 3–83 victory against the USA in June 2000 is their highest score and largest winning margin against any international opponent. Ireland have won all eleven matches played between the teams. In March 1990 an under-25 Ireland side beat at full USA side 12–10 at Thomond Park. Four days prior to competing in their first international test match, a full USA side beat an Ireland Development side 13–20 at the Galway Sportsground on 1 November 1994.

Summary
Note: Summary below reflects test results by both teams.

Overview

Records 
Note: Date shown in brackets indicates when the record was or last set.

Attendance
Up to date as of 16 November 2022

Results

XV Results
Below is a list of matches that the United States has awarded matches test match status by virtue of awarding caps, but Ireland did not award caps.

References

Ireland national rugby union team matches
United States national rugby union team matches